Meromenia is a genus of solenogasters, shell-less, worm-like, marinemollusks.

Species
 Meromenia hirondellei Leloup, 1949

References

 Leloup E. (1949). Meromenia hirondellei g.nov., sp. nov., Solenogastre du Golfe de Gascogne. Bulletin du Musée Royal d'Histoire Naturelle de Belgique 25(1): 1-6 
 García-Álvarez O., Salvini-Plawen L.v., Urgorri V. & Troncoso J.S. (2014). Mollusca. Solenogastres, Caudofoveata, Monoplacophora. Fauna Iberica. 38: 1-294

Solenogastres